Stranger in This Town is the first solo studio album by Richie Sambora, the guitarist from the New Jersey band Bon Jovi. The album was released in 1991, while Bon Jovi was on a 17-month hiatus. Jon Bon Jovi also released a solo album, Blaze of Glory (1990), during this period.

Recording and production
As his first solo album, Sambora experimented with a more blues-oriented sound. He sings lead vocals and plays guitar on the album, backed by his Bon Jovi bandmates Tico Torres on drums and David Bryan on keyboards, joined by Tony Levin on bass guitar. Eric Clapton makes a guest appearance playing guitar on the track "Mr. Bluesman".

"Ballad of Youth", "One Light Burning" and "The Answer" were co-written with colleagues from his former club band Shark Frenzy. "Rosie" was originally intended to be a Bon Jovi song for their fourth album New Jersey; versions of this song with the full Bon Jovi line-up have surfaced as bootlegs.

"Ballad of Youth" was released as the lead single followed by the second single "One Light Burning". The album titled track, "Stranger in This Town" was released as the third single and "Mr. Bluesman" featuring Eric Clapton was released as a promo single. The first three singles were accompanied by music videos.

The first radio promotional single was "Church of Desire" in the United Kingdom. "The Answer" and "Rosie" were also released as promo singles in Japan.

Occasionally, "Stranger in This Town" has been played by Sambora on Bon Jovi's tours, most recently on their Lost Highway Tour in 2008.

Chart performance
The album charted at #36 on the Billboard 200 and #20 on the UK Albums Chart.

The lead single, "Ballad of Youth", reached a high of #63 on the U.S. Billboard Hot 100 and #59 in the UK. The album titled track, "Stranger in This Town" charted at #38 on the Mainstream rock charts.

Track listing

Personnel
 Richie Sambora - lead vocals, electric and acoustic guitars, strings arrangement, producer
 David Bryan - keyboards, strings arrangement
 Tico Torres - drums, percussion
 Eric Clapton - guitar solo on "Mr. Bluesman"
 Tony Levin - bass guitar, Chapman Stick
 Randy Jackson - bass guitar on "One Light Burning"
 Dean Fasano, Franke Previte, Curtis King, Bekka Bramlett, Isabella Lento, Tawatha Agee, Brenda White-King - background vocals
 Jeff Bova, Robbie Buchanan, Larry Fast, Jimmy Bralower, Chris Palmaro, Eric Persing - keyboards, programming
 Rafael Padilla, Carol Steele - percussion
 Neil Dorfsman - producer
 JD Dworkow - production coordination
 Jeff Hendrickson, Lance Phillips, Frank Wolf - engineering
 Bob Ludwig - mastering
 Tim White, Darryl Estrine - photography
 Margery Greenspan - art direction
 Katie Agresta - vocal coach
 Umi Kenyon - design

Notes 
 Album credits on ArtistDirect
 Richie Sambora biography on RockDetector

Charts

Album

Singles

References

1991 debut albums
Richie Sambora albums
Albums produced by Richie Sambora
Mercury Records albums